James Suzman is an anthropologist and the author of Affluence Without Abundance: The disappearing world of the Bushmen published by Bloomsbury in 2017.  He is the nephew of Janet Suzman and great-nephew of Helen Suzman. He is based in Cambridge, UK.

Early life and education
Suzman was born in Johannesburg, South Africa, and educated at Michaelhouse. He graduated with an MA (Hons) in social anthropology from the University of St Andrews in 1993. He was awarded a PhD in social anthropology from the University of Edinburgh in 1996.

Career
Suzman was the first social anthropologist to work in Namibia's eastern Omaheke among Southern Ju/'hoansi, where he exposed the brutal marginalisation of San people who had lost their lands to white cattle ranchers and pastoralist Herero people.

In 1998 Suzman was appointed to lead the landmark study, "The Regional Assessment of the Status of the San in Southern Africa",  based on an ACP/EU resolution.

Suzman later led an assessment by  Minority Rights Group International to assess how Namibia's ethnic minorities had fared in the first ten years of Namibian Independence. 
The subsequent report was published in 2002. Emerging during period of political upheaval in Namibia, it led to calls for the better protection of ethnic minorities in Namibia. The Namibian Government rejected the report's findings and the President, Sam Nujoma, accused Suzman of amplifying "ethnic tensions".

In 2001, Suzman was awarded the Smuts Commonwealth Fellowship in African Studies at the University of Cambridge.

Suzman later established a program to establish opportunities for Hai//om San to benefit from tourism revenues in Etosha National Park. He was also involved in the dispute that arose as a result of the illegal relocation of Gwi and Gana San from Botswana's Central Kalahari Game Reserve. He was highly critical of the Botswana Government's actions and, later, Survival International's campaign, which he claimed undermined ongoing negotiations between the Botswana Government and a coalition of organisations supporting the evicted San. Survival International, in turn, criticised Suzman and members of the negotiating team led by Ditshwanelo, The Botswana Centre for Human Rights of complicity with the Botswana Government.

In 2007, Suzman joined De Beers, where, as global head of public affairs, he developed the company's award-winning sustainability functions. He resigned in 2013.

In 2013 Suzman and Jimmy Wales teamed up with Lily Cole to launch Impossible.com at the Cambridge Union. In the same year he was invited to deliver the second Protimos Lecture at the Parliament Chamber of London's Inner Temple.

Publications
Suzman has published widely on San and other issues in academic journals, magazines and newspapers, including The New York Times. In 2017 he published Affluence Without Abundance: The Disappearing World of the Bushmen. 

Work: A History of How We Spend Our Time, was published in September 2020.

References

External links

 

1970 births
South African anthropologists
Living people
Alumni of Michaelhouse
Alumni of the University of St Andrews
Alumni of the University of Edinburgh
People from Johannesburg